Myall Lakes is an electoral district of the Legislative Assembly in the Australian state of New South Wales. It was represented by Stephen Bromhead of The Nationals until his death in 2023.

Myall Lakes covers most of the former Great Lakes Council including Forster, Tuncurry, Bulahdelah, Nabiac, Failford, Pacific Palms, Smiths Lake, Bungwahl, Coolongolook and Wootton, as well as most of the former City of Greater Taree including Taree, Cundletown, Wingham, Tinonee, Old Bar, Krambach, Nabiac, Possum Brush and Hallidays Point.

History
Myall Lakes was created in 1988, partly replacing Gloucester.

Members for Myall Lakes

Election results

References

Myall Lakes
Myall Lakes
1988 establishments in Australia
Mid North Coast
Mid-Coast Council